John Dodd (24 September 1717 – 9 February 1782) was an English  politician who sat in the House of Commons between 1741 and 1782.

Dodd was the only son of Randolph (or Randall) Dodd of Chester and was born on 24 September 1717. He succeeded his father in 1721. He was educated at Eton College from 1728 to 1732 and matriculated at King's College, Cambridge in 1735. Dodd was a close friend of Horace Walpole, and was returned as Whig Member of Parliament (MP) for Reading in 1741, and from 1755 to 1782. He became a Governor of the Foundling Hospital in 1739, and his second wife Juliana was an inspector of wet nurses in Berkshire for the Hospital.

Dodd lived at Swallowfield Park, near Reading. He married firstly Jane, the daughter of Henry Le Coq St. Leger of Shinfield, Berkshire, with whom he had 3 sons and a daughter and secondly Juliana, the daughter of Philip Jennings of Duddleston Hall, Shropshire, with whom he had a further son and 3 daughters. He died at Swallowfield on 9 February 1782.

References 

1717 births
1782 deaths
Alumni of King's College, Cambridge
British MPs 1754–1761
British MPs 1761–1768
British MPs 1768–1774
British MPs 1774–1780
British MPs 1780–1784
People educated at Eton College
People from Swallowfield
Members of the Parliament of Great Britain for Reading
Whig (British political party) MPs for English constituencies